Flora station could refer to:

 Flora station (Illinois), a historic rail depot in Flora, Illinois, United States
 Flora (Prague Metro), a metro station in Prague, Czech Republic
 Bovenkarspel Flora railway station, a station in the Netherlands